Athene or Athena is the shrewd companion of heroes and the goddess of heroic endeavour in Greek mythology.

Athene may also refer to:
881 Athene, a main-belt asteroid
Athene (bird), a genus of small owls
Athene (Cynuria), a town in ancient Cynuria, Greece
Athene Glacier, a glacier in Antarctica
HMS Athene, an aircraft transport
USS Athene (AKA-22), an Artemis-class attack cargo ship
Bachir Boumaaza or Athene (born  1980), Belgian YouTube personality and social activist
Athene (research center), stylized as ATHENE, an IT security research institute in Darmstadt, Germany

People with the given name
Athene Seyler (1889–1990), English actress
Athene Donald (born 1953), British physicist

See also
Altena (disambiguation)
Atena (disambiguation)
Athen (disambiguation)
Athena (disambiguation)
Athens (disambiguation)